Robert "Bob" Amsterdam (born 1956) is a Canadian international lawyer of the law firm Amsterdam & Partners, with offices in Washington, D.C. and London.

Early life and education

Amsterdam was born in 1956 in White Plains, New York, and moved to Ottawa, Ontario, Canada at a young age where he grew up as a Canadian citizen.

Amsterdam was awarded a B.A. from Carleton University (Ottawa, Canada) in 1975 and a LL.B. from Queen's University (Kingston, Canada) in 1978.  Amsterdam is currently based in London, United Kingdom, while the firm continues to maintain an office in Washington DC.

Amsterdam was admitted to the Canadian Bar in 1980 and he is also admitted as a solicitor in London, United Kingdom.

Major cases
Some of Amsterdam's most well known cases were related to early work in Africa and Latin America (well before his later Russia-related issues).  Amsterdam won a major international litigation on behalf of the Four Seasons Hotel and Resort Group in Venezuela, and he also worked the well known Gutierrez case in Guatemala, which involved representing the victims of one of the country's largest alleged tax fraud and money laundering schemes.  Amsterdam would go on to represent famous political prisoners such as Eligio Cedeño in Venezuela, African political leaders such as Nigeria's Nasir Ahmad el-Rufai, and leading democracy advocates such as Singapore's Dr. Chee Soon Juan.

Yukos case
In 2003, Amsterdam was retained by the Russian company Yukos-Group MENATEP to defend former CEO Mikhail Khodorkovsky.

In 2005, Khodorkovsky was sentenced to eight years in jail.  On the night of the verdict, Amsterdam was accosted by plainclothes security agents in the middle of the night at his hotel room, who attempted to arrest him before he could call his colleagues in the media.  In the years since leaving Russia, Amsterdam engaged in a media campaign for the Yukos Group-MENATEP and Khodorkovsky cases.

Thaksin Shinawatra

Robert Amsterdam was hired in May 2010 by former Thai Prime Minister Thaksin Shinawatra to serve as international lawyer and adviser to the defence counsel of the "Red Shirts," formal name the United Front for Democracy Against Dictatorship (UDD).

In 2010, Robert Amsterdam "urged the international community not to tolerate the government's violent crackdown on self-proclaimed peaceful protesters,” and published a list of alleged human rights and international law violations committed during what he called the "Bangkok massacres".

During the 2013–14 Thai political crisis, Amsterdam delivered a speech to a massive Red Shirt rally in Bangkok. Former Democrat Party member and anti-government protest leader Suthep Thaugsuban criticized Amsterdam for it, to which Amsterdam responded naming Suthep as a Thai Taliban.

Kim Dotcom
He is now part of the legal team representing Kim Dotcom, the Internet entrepreneur in the Megaupload legal case.

Republic of Turkey 
Robert Amsterdam and firm were involved in efforts to sue the Gülen movement as part of a wider effort by the Turkish government to suppress it..

References

External links
 

1956 births
American emigrants to Canada
20th-century Canadian lawyers
Lawyers in Ontario
Living people
People from White Plains, New York
Yukos
Carleton University alumni
Queen's University Faculty of Law alumni
21st-century Canadian lawyers